Sebastian "Baste" Zimmerman Duterte (born November 3, 1987) is a Filipino politician serving as Mayor of Davao City since June 30, 2022. He previously served as the city's vice mayor from 2019 to 2022. He is the youngest son of 16th president Rodrigo Duterte, and the younger brother of vice president Sara Duterte.

Early life and education
Duterte was born on November 3, 1987, in Davao City. He is the youngest son of former President Rodrigo Duterte and Elizabeth Zimmerman, a Filipina flight-attendant of Filipino and German Jewish descent. His brother, Paolo, is the incumbent representative of Davao City's first district, and his sister Sara is incumbent vice president.

Duterte obtained his high school diploma at San Beda College in Manila. He took up legal management at the same college for a year before moving back to Davao, where he took up political science at Ateneo de Davao University.

He was initially offered by his father to run for Davao City councilor in 2013 and representative in 2016 but he declined.

Political career
In 2019, Duterte ran unopposed for vice mayor of Davao City with his sister and incumbent mayor, Sara, as his running mate under the Hugpong ng Pagbabago ticket.  The siblings won the election.  He has been appointed "acting mayor" of the city twice: from July 19 to September 17, 2019; and from September 28 to October 5, 2020.

On November 9, 2021, Duterte has decided to withdraw his re-election bid. He named Melchor Quitain Jr., Davao City's 1st district councilor and son of Chief Presidential Legal Counsel Jesus Melchor Quitain, as his substitute for vice mayor. He then ran for mayor as a substitute to his sister Sara, who would later run for vice president. He later won in a landslide victory and assumed office on June 30, 2022.

Personal life
Duterte is a dedicated surfer and often posts images of himself surfing.  He launched his own reality travel show Lakbai on TV5. He has three children, of which two is with his long-time live-in partner.

References

|-

1987 births
Living people
Visayan people
Filipino people of German-Jewish descent
Politicians from Davao del Sur
PDP–Laban politicians
TV5 (Philippine TV network) personalities
Children of presidents of the Philippines
Duterte family
Ateneo de Davao University alumni
Mayors of Davao City